Seid Korac (born 20 October 2001) is a Luxembourgian professional footballer who plays as a centre-back for Allsvenskan club Degerfors IF and the Luxembourg national team.

Club career
Having started his youth career at CS Oberkorn, Korac joined the Rodange 91 academy in 2014, along with his two older brothers Irfan and Kenan. Integrated into the professional team competing in the Luxembourg National Division from 2017, he contributed to the team avoiding relegation in the 2017–18 season.

Korac left Rodange in January 2019 to join Bundesliga club 1. FC Nürnberg. In Nuremberg, Korac quickly distinguished himself with the youth teams, scoring a goal in his first appearance with the U19s. The following season, he joined the club's reserve team, playing in the Regionalliga.

On 11 August 2021, Korac joined Danish 1st Division club Esbjerg fB on a deal until June 2024. On 24 August 2022, Korac was loaned out to newly promoted Cypriot First Division side Akritas Chlorakas until the end of 2022. In the beginning of January 2023, Korac left Esbjerg and joined Allsvenskan club Degerfors IF, signing a deal until the end of 2025.

International career
Korac made his international debut for Luxembourg on 11 November 2020 in a friendly match against Austria.

Personal life
Korac is Bosniak of Serbian descent.

Career statistics

International

References

External links
 
 
 
 

2001 births
Living people
People from Differdange
Luxembourgian footballers
Luxembourg youth international footballers
Luxembourg under-21 international footballers
Luxembourg international footballers
Luxembourgian expatriate footballers
Luxembourgian people of Bosnia and Herzegovina descent
Association football defenders
CS Oberkorn players
FC Rodange 91 players
1. FC Nürnberg players
Akritas Chlorakas players
Esbjerg fB players
Degerfors IF players
Luxembourg National Division players
Luxembourg Division of Honour players
Regionalliga players
Danish 1st Division players
Cypriot First Division players
Expatriate footballers in Germany
Expatriate men's footballers in Denmark
Expatriate footballers in Cyprus
Luxembourgian expatriate sportspeople in Germany
Luxembourgian expatriate sportspeople in Cyprus
Luxembourgian expatriate sportspeople in Sweden